EFILE is the system used by the Canada Revenue Agency as a means for electronically transmitting tax returns.  It became a national program in 1993. EFILE is only available to professional tax preparers and is not to be confused with the publicly available NETFILE. EFILE is a form of Electronic Data Interchange.

Requirements 
 A form T183, Information Return for Electronic Filing of an Individual's Income Tax and Benefit Return, needs to be signed by the client.
 Software meeting CRA certification standards, such as Intuit's Profile or Microsophic Inc.'s Visual Tax. 
 Must be a professional to qualify, along with passing the CRA screening of new applicants.

Advantages 

 Fast and convenient, can be filed anywhere with an internet connection.
 Returns are processed much faster than conventional paper filing.
 Reduces usage of paper, saves money and is environmentally friendly.
 More reliable since you can retain paper slips, and no chance of getting return lost in mail.

Disadvantages 
 Requires a professional tax preparer to file.
 Preparer must have knowledge of system and be approved by CRA to EFILE.

See also 
 NETFILE

References

Taxation in Canada